Rinata Ilmatova (born 23 September 1999) is an Uzbekistani judoka.

In 2018, she competed in the women's +78 kg event at the 2018 Asian Games held in Jakarta, Indonesia. She also competed in the mixed team event.

She won a medal at the 2021 World Judo Championships.

References

External links
 

1999 births
Living people
Uzbekistani female judoka
Judoka at the 2018 Asian Games
Asian Games competitors for Uzbekistan
21st-century Uzbekistani women